Euborellia pallipes is a species of earwig in the family Anisolabididae.

References

Anisolabididae